Vitaly Pushnitsky (born 7 July 1967) is a Russian artist. He is considered one of Russia's leading contemporary artists. He is based in Saint-Petersburg, Russia and is internationally recognized as a painter, sculptor, graphic artist and as a creator of installations, art objects and multimedia.

Biography 
Vitaly Pushnitsky was born on 7 July 1967 in Leningrad, Union of Soviet Socialist Republics (USSR). After leaving Leningrad Secondary Art School, he studied at the Graphics Department of St.Petersburg Academy of Arts (1988—1994). Since 1994, he has been a member of Saint Petersburg Union of Artists.

He has had exhibitions at the Kala Art Institute (2002), at Jawaharlal Nehru University in New Delhi (2005), at the Tamarind Institute at University of New Mexico (2007), as well as at Cité International des Arts in Paris in 2012.

Pushnitsky's personal exhibitions took place at the State Russian Museum (2002) and the State Hermitage Museum (2006) in St.Petersburg, at the Moscow Museum of Modern Art (2012) and others.

Collaborating with the major Russian and western art galleries, Pushnitsky is conducting his own original exhibition project "Belka&Strelka" co-authored with an art critic and curator Dmitry Pilikin. Commonly the works of Pushnitsky are presented on the international art scene.

In 2011 the British publisher of art Phaidon Press included Vitaly Pushnitsky in the list of "115 artists working internationally who have been nominated by highly respected critics and curators for their outstanding contributions to recent painting".

Gallery

Museum collections and foundations 

 The State Russian Museum. St Petersburg, Russia
 Moscow Museum of Modern Art. Russia
 The Museum of Contemporary Art ERARTA. St Petersburg, Russia
 Novy Museum. St Petersburg, Russia
 ArtLink. New York, USA
 Chairman, Aldrich Museum of Art. New York, USA
 Contemporary Art Museum art4.ru. Moscow, Russia
 Freud's Dream Museum. St Petersburg, Russia
 Kala Art Institute. Berkeley, San Francisco, USA
 Kolding Art Institute. Kolding, Denmark
 Kolodzei Art Foundation, Highland Park, NJ, USA
 Perm Museum of Contemporary Art (PERMM), Perm, Russia
 Red Bull Collection, Salzburg, Austria
 RuArts Foundation. Moscow, Russia
 The Krasnoyarsk Museum Centre. Krasnoyarsk, Russia
 The National Centre of Contemporary Art. Moscow, Russia
 The State Kaliningrad Art Gallery. Kaliningrad, Russia
 The State Novosibirsk Art Museum. Novosibirsk, Russia

Sources 

1967 births
Living people
20th-century Russian painters
Russian male painters
21st-century Russian painters
Russian contemporary artists
Painters from Saint Petersburg
Leningrad Secondary Art School alumni
Repin Institute of Arts alumni
20th-century Russian male artists
21st-century Russian male artists